The International Stereotypers' and Electrotypers' Union (ISEU) was a labor union representing workers in two related trades in the United States and Canada.

The union was founded in August 1902, as a split from the International Typographical Union, and was immediately chartered by the American Federation of Labor. By 1926, it had 7,000 members. The union later affiliated to the AFL–CIO, and by 1957, its membership had risen to 13,577.

In 1971, the union renamed itself as the International Stereotypers', Electrotypers' and Platemakers' Union. On 1 October 1973, it merged with the International Printing Pressmen and Assistants' Union of North America, to form the International Printing and Graphic Communications Union.

References

Trade unions established in 1902
Trade unions disestablished in 1973
Printing trade unions